Fazlabad (Maleki) (also Romanized as Faẕlābād (Maleki) and Fazlābād) is a village in Fakhrud Rural District, Qohestan District, Darmian County, South Khorasan Province, Iran. At the 2006 census, its population was 144, in 44 families.

References 

Populated places in Darmian County